Gerd Achterberg (born 4 December 1940 in Berlin) is a former German football manager.

Achterberg scored 131 goals in 327 games for Spandauer BC as a player and later went on to coach the team in two stints as manager. He also led Tennis Borussia Berlin to the 1984–85 Amateur-Oberliga Berlin championship and promotion to the 2. Fußball-Bundesliga, but was replaced by Eckhard Krautzun in the autumn of 1985 after winning only three out of the season's first 12 games.

References

External links 
 

1940 births
Living people
German footballers
Footballers from Berlin
German football managers
2. Bundesliga managers
Tennis Borussia Berlin managers
Association football forwards
20th-century German people